Labanda herbealis is a moth in the family Nolidae first described by Francis Walker in 1859. It is found in Sri Lanka and Borneo.

Description
The forewings are green and black with a finely zigzag course to the fasciae. Postmedial and antemedial have grayish patches.

References

Moths of Asia
Moths described in 1859
Chloephorinae